"100" is a song by American rapper The Game featuring Canadian rapper Drake. The song is the first single from The Game's sixth studio album, The Documentary 2. The song was premiered by DJ Envy on Power 105.1 on June 25, 2015. The title refers to speaking the truth, or "keeping it 100". The main theme of the song is how fame can erode trust among friends. It contains a sample of "Feel the Fire" by Peabo Bryson.

Critical reception
Upon release, "100" received critical acclaim from music critics. Rap-Up called the beat "soulful", and added that Drake "holds down the hook". Zach Rydenlund of Complex noted that the song is "a bit slower", but "has the potential to be a hit". Latifah Muhammad of BET wrote that the instrumental "definitely something special". Stereogums Tom Breihan also gave a positive review to the song describing it as "warm" and "soulful".

Music video
The Game and Drake were already shooting the music video in Compton, California weeks before the song was released. The video premiered on Vevo on July 30, 2015.

Track listingDigital download"100" (Explicit)  – 5:43
"100" (Clean)  – 5:43Album version'
"100"  – 5:34

Commercial performance
Upon its radio release, "100" was the most added song on both urban contemporary and rhythmic contemporary radio of the week. The song peaked at number 82 on the Billboard Hot 100 and charted for 10 weeks. The song also peaked at number 25 on the Hot R&B/Hip-Hop Songs chart, remaining there for 18 weeks. "100" also received some chart success in Canada where it has peaked at number 63 on the Canadian Hot 100, mixed & mastered Steve B, making it Game's second highest-charting single on the chart after "My Life" which peaked at number 42 in 2008.

Charts

Release history

Certifications

References

2015 singles
The Game (rapper) songs
2015 songs
Drake (musician) songs
Songs written by Drake (musician)
Songs written by The Game (rapper)
Song recordings produced by Cardo (record producer)
MNRK Music Group singles
Songs written by Cardo (record producer)